Landry Nany Dimata (born 1 September 1997) is a Belgian professional footballer who plays as a forward for Dutch club NEC on loan from the Spanish club Espanyol.

Club career
Dimata played with Standard Liège as a junior. He joined Oostende in 2016. He made his Belgian Pro League debut on 4 August 2016 against Genk. In July 2017, Dimata joined VfL Wolfsburg for a fee of €10 million.

In July 2018, Dimata moved to Belgium club Anderlecht, on a loan deal until the end of the season with an option to buy. In November 2018, Anderlecht exercised the purchase option on Dimata.

On 1 February 2021, Dimata moved to Spanish side Espanyol, on a loan deal until the end of the season. The deal included a purchase option. On 2 June 2021, he joined Espanyol permanently.

On 30 August 2022, Dimata moved on loan to NEC in the Netherlands.

International career
In September 2020, Dimata was called up to the senior Belgium squad for the UEFA Nations League matches against Denmark and Iceland.

Career statistics

References

External links
 
 

1997 births
Living people
Association football forwards
Belgian footballers
Belgium youth international footballers
Belgium under-21 international footballers
Democratic Republic of the Congo footballers
Belgian sportspeople of Democratic Republic of the Congo descent
Belgian Pro League players
Bundesliga players
La Liga players
Segunda División players
K.V. Oostende players
VfL Wolfsburg players
R.S.C. Anderlecht players
RCD Espanyol footballers
NEC Nijmegen players
Belgian expatriate footballers
Belgian expatriate sportspeople in Germany
Belgian expatriate sportspeople in Spain
Belgian expatriate sportspeople in the Netherlands
Expatriate footballers in Germany
Expatriate footballers in Spain
Expatriate footballers in the Netherlands
Black Belgian sportspeople